Chaguarpamba is a location in the Loja Province, Ecuador. It is the seat of the Chaguarpamba Canton.

References 
 www.inec.gov.ec
 www.ame.gov.ec

External links 
 Map of the Loja Province

Populated places in Loja Province